Ortrud (minor planet designation: 551 Ortrud) is a minor planet orbiting the Sun. It is located in the Main Belt. In light of the practice of the discover c. 1904 to name his asteroids after female characters in opera, it is likely that Ortrud is named after a character in Richard Wagner's opera Lohengrin.

References

External links 
 
 

000551
Discoveries by Max Wolf
Named minor planets
Richard Wagner
000551
000551
19041116